Roland Matthes (17 November 1950 – 20 December 2019) was a German swimmer and the most successful backstroke swimmer of all time. Between April 1967 and August 1974 he won all backstroke competitions he entered. He won four European championships and three world championships in a row, and swam 19 world and 28 European records in various backstroke, butterfly and medley events. He was trained by Marlies Grohe.

Swimming career

As an Olympian in 1968, 1972 and 1976 he won a total of eight medals (four gold, two silver and two bronze): In 1968 and 1972 he won gold in both the 100 m and 200 m backstroke, while in 1976 he was third in the 100 m backstroke. In addition to these individual events, he won the 4 × 100 m team medley silver in 1968 and 1972, and a bronze medal for the 4 × 100 m freestyle relay in 1972.  At Montreal, he was the only East German male swimmer to win a medal.

In 1973 in Belgrade he became the first world champion holding the titles in both the 100 m and 200 m backstroke. Additionally he won silver in the 4 × 100 m medley and bronze in the 4 × 100 m freestyle relay. Two years later in 1975 he defended his world title in the 100 m backstroke.

At the European championships in 1970 in Barcelona and 1974 in Vienna he won all four titles for the 100 and 200 m backstroke. Additionally, in Barcelona he won the individual silver for the 100 m freestyle, gold with the 4 × 100 m medley team, and bronze with both the 4×100 and 4 × 200 m freestyle teams. In Vienna, he also won the individual silver for 100 m butterfly, and bronze with the 4 × 100 m freestyle team.

He was selected East German Sportspersonality of the Year seven times, in 1967–1971, 1973 and 1975. In 1981 he was inducted into the International Swimming Hall of Fame.

From 1970 to 1977 he studied sport sciences at DHfK in Leipzig and from 1978 to 1984 he studied medicine at the University of Jena. After graduating he worked as an orthopedic surgeon. He retired from swimming in 1976, and in May 1978 married Kornelia Ender, a fellow East German Olympic swimmer. They divorced in 1982.

The issue of doping in East Germany brought into questioning most achievements of East German athletes. However, Matthes denied any involvement in doping, claiming that his swimming club was too small to be part of the government system.

Death

Matthes died on December 20, 2019 at the age
of 69.

His competitor in the backstroke and five time  Olympic champion John Naber said of Matthes upon his death "Roland was the greatest backstroker that ever lived. He is the only swimmer to successfully defend both Olympic backstroke titles, and he also won medals in international competition in freestyle and butterfly. Some say that only a slow reaction to the gun kept Roland from giving Mark Spitz the race of his life in the 1972 Olympic 100-meter butterfly final in Munich. Matthes was invincible on his back for a decade. His smooth strokes and powerful acceleration made every race I watched him swim become a foregone conclusion".

See also

 List of members of the International Swimming Hall of Fame
 World record progression 100 metres backstroke
 World record progression 200 metres backstroke
 World record progression 4 × 100 metres medley relay

References

External links

 
 
 
 

1950 births
2019 deaths
People from Pößneck
East German male backstroke swimmers
East German male butterfly swimmers
East German male freestyle swimmers
Sportspeople from Thuringia
East German physicians
20th-century German physicians
German orthopedic surgeons
Olympic swimmers of East Germany
Swimmers at the 1968 Summer Olympics
Swimmers at the 1972 Summer Olympics
Swimmers at the 1976 Summer Olympics
Olympic gold medalists for East Germany
Olympic silver medalists for East Germany
Olympic bronze medalists for East Germany
World record setters in swimming
Olympic bronze medalists in swimming
World Aquatics Championships medalists in swimming
European Aquatics Championships medalists in swimming
Medalists at the 1968 Summer Olympics
Medalists at the 1972 Summer Olympics
Medalists at the 1976 Summer Olympics
Olympic gold medalists in swimming
Olympic silver medalists in swimming
Recipients of the Patriotic Order of Merit (honor clasp)
20th-century surgeons